Ignasi de Solà-Morales Rubió (Barcelona 1942 - Amsterdam 2001) was an architect, historian and philosopher from Catalonia, Spain.

He was professor of composition at the Barcelona School of Architecture, and also taught at the universities of Princeton, Columbia, Turin, and Cambridge.

Among his most notable architectural works are the reconstruction of Ludwig Mies van der Rohe's Barcelona Pavilion, and the reconstruction and expansion of the Liceu Theatre in Barcelona.

Ignasi de Solà-Morales has coined the term "terrain vague", applied to abandoned, obsolete and unproductive areas, with no clear definitions and limits.

Publications
1975: Rubió i Bellver y la fortuna del Gaudinismo
1976: L'arquitectura del expresionismo
1976: Centenari de l'Escola d'Arquitectura de Barcelona. Un assaig d'interpretació
1980: Eclecticismo y vanguardia
1983: Gaudí
1984: Arquitectura teatral en España
1985: L'Exposició Internacional de Barcelona 1914-1929
1986: Arquitectura Minimale a Barcelona
1986: Contemporary Spanish Architecture
1986: Arquitectura balneària a Catalunya
1996: Diferencias: topografía de l'arquitectura contemporánea

References

Architects from Catalonia
Urban theorists
1942 births
2001 deaths